Radio Sonora is the state radio network of the Mexican state of Sonora. It serves 95% of the state through its 30 FM transmitters, making it the second-largest state radio network in Mexico.

It began operations during the government of Samuel Ocaña García (1979–85).

Transmitters
The state of Sonora owns 30 radio transmitters, the second-most of any state in Mexico, to carry the Radio Sonora network. Bacerac and San Javier were added in September 2021.

Notes:

References

External links
 

Radio stations in Sonora
Public radio in Mexico